WCYY (94.3 FM) is a commercial radio station licensed to Biddeford, Maine, and serving the Portland metropolitan area.  Its target audience are men between 18 and 44. The station airs an active/alternative rock radio format and is owned by Townsquare Media.  It carries the syndicated morning show Toucher and Rich from WBZ-FM Boston.  WCYY studios are at One City Center in Portland.

WCYY has an effective radiated power (ERP) of 11,500 watts.  The transmitter is on Cascade Road in Saco, Maine.  WCYY is the flagship station of a three-station simulcast, including WPKQ 103.7 FM on Mount Washington, New Hampshire, and WJZN 1400 AM and 95.9 FM in Augusta, Maine.

History

WIDE-FM, WBYC, WYJY and WSTG
Its original call sign was WIDE-FM. It simulcast the middle of the road programming of its sister station WIDE 1400 AM (now WVAE). The stations were owned by Hoy Communications and were affiliates of the ABC Information Radio Network.  

WIDE-FM became WBYC ("We're Beautiful York County") on March 1, 1981, with a beautiful music format.  The station was mostly automated and played quarter hour sweeps of instrumental cover versions of pop hits, Broadway and Hollywood show tunes. On December 2, 1985, WBYC became WYJY playing soft adult contemporary music as "Joy 94.3".  WYJY changed its call letters to WSTG on January 28, 1991, moving to a bit more upbeat adult contemporary format as "Star 94.3".

WCYY
On July 8, 1994, WSTG flipped to adult album alternative and changed call sign to WCYY.  After a while, WCYY went modern rock which it still plays.  Prior to June 2007, WCYY was simulcast on 93.9 WCYI in Lewiston, Maine.  That station was bought by the Educational Media Foundation and switched to Christian Contemporary music as part of the Air1 network.  On February 21, 2008, WCYY moved to a new studio.

On August 30, 2013, a deal was announced in which Townsquare Media would acquire 53 Cumulus Media stations, including WCYY, for $238 million. The deal was part of Cumulus' acquisition of Dial Global; Townsquare and Dial Global are both controlled by Oaktree Capital Management. The sale to Townsquare was completed on November 14, 2013.

WCYY is one of six alternative stations under Townsquare Media (another being Hudson Valley's WRRV, also acquired from Cumulus Media).

Simulcast
WCYY began simulcasting on WPKQ (103.7 FM) in North Conway, New Hampshire, and WJZN (1400 AM and 95.9 FM) in Augusta, Maine on October 25, 2021. The expansion, which resulted in WCYY's programming being heard in much of northern New England (in part because of WPKQ's transmitter on Mount Washington), was promoted as "WCYY 3.0." 

The simulcast coincided with the syndication launch of Toucher and Rich from WBZ-FM Boston.  The three WCYY stations, along with Bangor sister station 92.9 WEZQ, became the program's first four affiliates.

References

External links
 Official Website

CYY
Modern rock radio stations in the United States
Townsquare Media radio stations
Radio stations established in 1972
Biddeford, Maine